Home is the twenty-sixth solo studio album by American country music singer-songwriter Loretta Lynn. It was released on August 11, 1975, by MCA Records.

Critical reception
In the issue dated August 23, 1975, Billboard published a review that said, "If it's Loretta, it's got to be great, and this is no exception. It seems that, with every session, she discovers there are more things she can do with her versatility, and she proceeds to do them. She sings a great number of tunes already done by others, but simply shows that she can hold her own in the competition. Greatness with Loretta is more than an implication." The review noted "You Take Me to Heaven Every Night", "No Place Else to Go", and "Bring Some of It Home" as the best cuts on the album, with a note to record dealers that said, "On the cover is a country girl; on the back cover is a mansion. Both belong to Loretta."

Commercial performance 
The album peaked at No. 7 on the Billboard Top Country Albums chart. The album's single, "Home", peaked at No. 10 on the Billboard Hot Country Songs chart.

Recording 
Recording sessions for the album took place on June 10, June 11 and June 20, 1975, at Bradley's Barn in Mount Juliet, TN. Four songs on the album were from previous recording sessions. "Home" and "He's Only Everything" were the first songs to be released from an October 8, 1974 session. "Bring Some of It Home" was recorded on March 5, 1974, during a session for 1974's They Don't Make 'Em Like My Daddy. "No Place Else to Go" was recorded during the December 19, 1974 session for 1975's Back to the Country.

Track listing

Personnel 
Adapted from album liner notes.
Harold Bradley – bass guitar
Owen Bradley – producer
Ray Edenton – guitar
Johnny Gimble – fiddle
Lloyd Green – steel guitar
The Jordanaires – backing vocals
Mike Leech – bass
Kenny Malone – drums
Grady Martin – guitar
Charlie McCoy – harmonica/vibes
Hargus "Pig" Robbins – piano
Hal Rugg – steel guitar
Jerry Smith – piano
Pete Wade – guitar

Chart positions 
Album – Billboard (North America)

Singles – Billboard (North America)

References 

1975 albums
Loretta Lynn albums
Albums produced by Owen Bradley
MCA Records albums